Shuài (帥) is a Chinese surname. Shi ( OC: /*sri/) was changed to Shuai (  OC:) to avoid conflict with the name of Sima Shi, a military general and regent of Cao Wei during the Three Kingdoms period of China. Shuai is the 298th most common surname in China.

People with the surname Shuai include:
Shuai Pei-ling

See also
Shuai jiao
Yuan shuai
Da yuan shuai

References

 

Chinese-language surnames
Individual Chinese surnames